Speaker of the National Assembly of Mauritius is the presiding officer in the National Assembly. The speaker is elected by the members of the National Assembly and does not have to be a member of the National Assembly.

Below is a list of speakers of the National Assembly (until 1992 the Legislative Assembly) of Mauritius:

References

Politics of Mauritius
Mauritius
 
1957 establishments in Mauritius